Dean Rickles (born July 17, 1977) is Professor of History and Philosophy of Modern Physics at the University of Sydney and a Director of the Sydney Centre for Time.

Life
Dean Rickles was born in Hull, Yorkshire. He briefly trained as a concert pianist at the London College of Music, before switching to philosophy. He received an MA from the University of Sheffield (1999) and PhD from the University of Leeds (2004). During a two-year postdoctoral fellowship at the University of Calgary in 2005, he worked on the application of complex systems theory to population health. He took up a lectureship at the University of Sydney in 2007 and was awarded a five-year Australian Research Council fellowship in 2008 followed by an Australian Research Council Future Fellowship in 2014.

He has one daughter, Gaia (born 2004). His spouse is Miroslava Hirnerova. They live in the Southern Highlands of New South Wales, Australia.

Work

Rickles primary focus is on string theory, quantum gravity, and symmetries. His doctoral dissertation, Quantum Gravity in Philosophical Focus (published as a book in 2007), set the foundations for his oft-quoted work within history of string theory and as well as deepening our understanding of the foundations and history of quantum gravity more generally with a series of studies and interviews, culminating in his book  Covered in Deep Mist: The Development of Quantum Gravity, 1916-1956 (Oxford University Press 2020).

Other philosophical papers include econophysics, public health and musicology, as well as deeper issues such as the question of Why there is anything at all

In a 2012 collaboration with Huw Price, he developed the John Templeton Foundation project New Agendas for the Study of Time: Connecting the Disciplines.

Rickles was president of Australian Association for the History, Philosophy, and Social Studies of Science  and
Society (AAHPSSS) during the period 2012–2014. He is also a member of the New York Academy of Sciences and the Foundational Questions Institute. He co-edits the Routledge Studies in the Philosophy of Mathematics and Physics with Elaine Landry.

Selected works
 Covered with Deep Mist: The Development of Quantum Gravity, 1916-1956 (Oxford University Press 2020)
 What is Philosophy of Science?  (Polity Press 2020)
 Quantum Gravity in the First Half of the 20th Century: A Sourcebook, co-authored with Alex Blum. (Max Planck Research Library for the History and Development of Knowledge 2018)
 Thinking about Science, Reflecting on Art, co-edited with O. Bueno, G. Darby, and S. French  (Routledge 2017)
 Dualities in Physics, co-edited with Elena Castellani (Special issue: Studies in the History and Philosophy of Modern Physics 2017)
 Philosophy of Physics (Polity Press 2016)
 Information and Interaction: Eddington, Wheeler, and the Limits of Knowledge, co-edited with Ian Durham  (Springer 2016)
 A Brief History of String Theory: From Dual Models to M-Theory (Springer 2014)
 Principles of Quantum Gravity, co-edited with Karen Crowther (Special issue: Studies in the History and Philosophy of Modern Physics 2014)
 Structural Realism: Structure, Object, and Causality, co-edited with Elaine Landry (The Western Ontario Series in Philosophy of Science, Volume 77, Springer 2012)
 The Role of Gravitation in Physics, co-edited with Cécile DeWitt (Max Planck Research Library for the History and Development of Knowledge, Volume 5, 2011)
 Ashgate Companion to Contemporary Philosophy of Physics  (Ashgate 2008)
 Symmetry, Structure, and Spacetime, Series on Philosophy and Foundations of Physics, Volume 3 (Elsevier 2007)
 The Structural Foundations of Quantum Gravity, co-edited with Steven French and Juha Saatsi (Oxford University Press 2006)

References

External links
 Faculty page at University of Sydney
 Jesse Dylan talking to Dean Rickles, Tim Maudlin, and Phillip Stamp
 Closer to the Truth overview of Dean Rickles
 Peter Woit's discussion of A Brief History of String Theory, by Dean Rickles
 Wolfgang Lerche's review for the CERN Courier of A Brief History of String Theory, by Dean Rickles 
 

1975 births
21st-century Australian philosophers
British string theorists
Living people
Philosophers of time
Academic staff of the University of Sydney